Kazuki Saito may refer to:
 Kazuki Saito (footballer, born 1988) (齊藤 和樹), Japanese footballer
 Kazuki Saito (footballer, born 1996) (齋藤 和希), Japanese footballer